Walid Hassan (born c. 1959 - d. 20 November 2006) was a Shia Muslim Iraqi comedian. At the time of his death he was one of five actors on Caricature, a 45-minute comedy satire on  Al-Sharqiyah TV, that did not hesitate to make fun of U.S. forces, Shiite militias, Sunni-Arab insurgent groups, and the chaotic governments that have tried to rule Iraq since Saddam Hussein was overthrown in the 2003 invasion.

The popular actor's TV show provided hard-pressed Iraqis with comic relief by poking fun at everything from politicians to long lines at fuel stations.

He was shot to death while driving through Baghdad on 20 November 2006. As with many other killings in Baghdad, the identity of the gunmen who shot Hassan was not known, police said.

He was buried on 21 November 2006 after his coffin was tied to the top of a taxi for the  journey from Baghdad to the Shia holy city of Najaf.

External links
Iraqi TV personality among 21 killed Monday (CNN) 
Murdered Iraqi TV comedian buried (BBC News)
Famous TV comedian shot dead during kidnapping attempt in Baghdad (Reporters sans frontières)
The Ha Ha Jihad (Thefifthcolumn.com)

1959 births
2006 deaths
2006 murders in Iraq
Iraqi murder victims
Iraqi comedians
Deaths by firearm in Iraq
Iraqi Shia Muslims
People murdered in Iraq
20th-century comedians